Graham Nash David Crosby is the first album by the partnership of David Crosby and Graham Nash, released on Atlantic Records in 1972, catalog SD 7220. It peaked at No. 4 on the Billboard 200 albums chart, and a single taken from the album, "Immigration Man", peaked at No. 36 on the Billboard Hot 100 on June 17 and 24, 1972. It was certified gold by the RIAA, and it was dedicated to Joni Mitchell, as "to Miss Mitchell".

History
After the split of Crosby, Stills, Nash & Young in the summer of 1970, all four members would release solo albums over the next 12 months. Neil Young and Stephen Stills would both pursue independent band projects through the early years of the decade, Young working with Crazy Horse and the Stray Gators, with Stills assembling Manassas. Both If I Could Only Remember My Name and Songs for Beginners respectively by Crosby and Nash fared well in the marketplace, and in the autumn of 1971 the duo embarked on a series of concerts together, unable or unwilling to include Stills and Young. However, Stills joined them for the September 30 performance at Carnegie Hall in New York. "Blacknotes" was recorded live, just before Stills took the stage for the second set. Two other live recordings from this concert were released in 2006 on Crosby's Voyage Box Set: "The Lee Shore" and "Traction in the Rain." All four members reunited at the Boston Music Hall on October 3 and back at Carnegie Hall the next night. The success of the tour led Crosby and Nash to take the new songs auditioned on the road into the recording studio.

Content
Sessions for this album featured backing from notable guests Dave Mason and members of The Grateful Dead — Jerry Garcia, Phil Lesh and Bill Kreutzmann. Most of the musical support came from The Section, a quartet of in-demand session musicians on the West Coast in the 1970s. Consisting of Craig Doerge, Danny Kortchmar, Leland Sklar, and Russell Kunkel, they would appear on dozens of albums, notably those by James Taylor, Carole King, and Jackson Browne. They would also continue to work with Crosby & Nash for the remainder of the decade, both in the studio and on tour.

The songs continued the qualities that marked the pair's work with the larger aggregate, with Nash writing tighter pop songs including the album's hit, and Crosby exploring mood pieces and introspection, all amidst the duo's usual vocal harmonies. The commercial success of this album equaled, if not surpassed a bit, that of the pair's two solo albums of the previous year, although it would not be until after the second break-up of CSNY following their 1974 summer tour that Crosby and Nash would sign an album contract as a unit with ABC Records. Following the release of this album, the duo toured in 1973 with a backing band including, at different times, David Lindley and future Eagles guitarist Don Felder.

This album was remastered for compact disc in 1998 as part of the Atlantic Original Sound series, 50 titles reissued in Europe to celebrate Atlantic Records' fiftieth anniversary. It is currently out of print, and American reissues still around use first generation digital remastering from the 1980s.

Track listing

Side one

Side two

Personnel
 David Crosby – vocals all tracks except "Blacknotes"; electric guitar on "Whole Cloth", "Page 43", "Frozen Smiles", "Girl to Be on My Mind", "The Wall Song" and "Immigration Man"; guitars on "Southbound Train", "Where Will I Be?" and "Games" 
 Graham Nash – vocals; acoustic piano on "Whole Cloth", "Blacknotes", "Stranger's Room", "Frozen Smiles", "The Wall Song" and "Immigration Man"; Hammond organ on "Girl to Be on My Mind" and "The Wall Song"; harmonica on "Southbound Train", "Stranger's Room" and "Frozen Smiles"; guitar on "Southbound Train"

Additional personnel
 Danny Kortchmar – electric guitar on "Whole Cloth", "Stranger's Room", "Page 43", "Frozen Smiles", "Games" and "Girl to Be on My Mind"
 Jerry Garcia – pedal steel guitar on "Southbound Train"; electric guitar on "The Wall Song"
 Dave Mason – electric guitar on "Immigration Man"
 Craig Doerge – electric piano on "Whole Cloth", "Where Will I Be?" and "Frozen Smiles"; acoustic piano on "Page 43", "Games" and "Girl to Be on My Mind"; Hammond organ on "Stranger's Room"
 Leland Sklar – bass on "Whole Cloth", "Stranger's Room", "Where Will I Be?", "Page 43", "Frozen Smiles", "Games" and "Girl to Be on My Mind"
 Chris Ethridge – bass on "Southbound Train"
 Phil Lesh – bass on "The Wall Song"
 Greg Reeves – bass on "Immigration Man"
 Russ Kunkel – drums on "Whole Cloth", "Stranger's Room", "Page 43", "Frozen Smiles", "Games" and "Girl to Be on My Mind"
 John Barbata – drums on "Southbound Train" and "Immigration Man"
 Bill Kreutzmann – drums on "The Wall Song"
 David Duke, Arthur Maebe, George Price – French horns on "Stranger's Room"
 Dana Africa – flute on "Where Will I Be?"

Production
 Crosby & Nash, Bill Halverson – producers
Bill Halverson, Doc Storch – engineers
 Jean Ristori – digital mastering
 Robert Hammer – photography
 David Geffen, Elliot Roberts – direction

Charts 

Singles

Certification

Tour 
Crosby & Nash tour dates surrounding this album.

References

External links
 Crosby & Nash 

1972 debut albums
Atlantic Records albums
Crosby & Nash albums
Albums produced by David Crosby
Albums produced by Graham Nash
Albums recorded at Wally Heider Studios